White Cross (Weiẞkreuz) is a World War I chemical warfare agent consisting of one or more lachrymatory agents: bromoacetone (BA), bromobenzyl cyanide (Camite), bromomethyl ethyl ketone (homomartonite, Bn-stoff), chloroacetone (Tonite, A-stoff), ethyl bromoacetate, and/or xylyl bromide.

During World War I, White Cross was also a generic code name used by the German Army for artillery shells with an irritant chemical payload affecting the eyes and mucous membranes.

See also 
 Blue Cross (chemical warfare)
 Green Cross (chemical warfare)
 Yellow Cross (chemical warfare)

References 

Lachrymatory agents
World War I chemical weapons